Benjamin James Thorpe was a Canadian Anglican priest, most notably  Archdeacon of St Andrews in the Diocese of Montreal from 1967 until 1974.

Thorpe was educated at McGill University and the Montreal Diocesan Theological College and ordained in 1931. After a curacy at  Clarendon he held incumbencies in Montreal, Pointe-Claire, Goodwin, Lachute and  Valleyfield.

References

20th-century Canadian Anglican priests
Archdeacons of St Andrews, PQ
Alumni of Montreal Diocesan Theological College
McGill University alumni